Rendiconti del Seminario Matematico della Università di Padova (The Mathematical Journal of the University of Padua) is a peer-reviewed mathematics journal published by Seminario Matematico of the University of Padua, established in 1930.

The journal is indexed by Mathematical Reviews and Zentralblatt MATH. Its 2009 MCQ was 0.22, and its 2009 impact factor was 0.311.

See also
Rendiconti del Seminario Matematico Università e Politecnico di Torino
Rendiconti di Matematica e delle sue Applicazioni
Rivista di Matematica della Università di Parma

External links

Mathematics journals
Publications established in 1930
English-language journals
Biannual journals
European Mathematical Society academic journals
Academic journals associated with universities and colleges